M. Siddique (1928 - February 4, 2013)  was a Bangladesh Awami League politician and the former member of parliament for Chittagong-14.

Life and career
He was born on 1928 in Chittagong district under Satkania Upazila.     
On December 17, 1970, he was elected as MPA at Provincial Assembly election from Chittagong-14 (P.E-294) and also he was elected to parliament from Chittagong-14 as a Bangladesh Awami League candidate in 1973. He died on February 4, 2013, at Satkania Upazila of his own residence.

References

1928 births
2013 deaths
Awami League politicians
1st Jatiya Sangsad members
People from Satkania Upazila